Spetisbury railway station was a station in the English county of Dorset. It was located between Blandford Forum and Bailey Gate on the Somerset and Dorset Joint Railway. The station consisted of two platforms, a station building, signal box and shelters.

The ‘down’ platform is the station's original platform, which opened with timber booking office and waiting rooms on 1 November 1860. The platform was extended and a separate brick-built ladies’ waiting room was provided in 1888. The concrete floor and fireplace you see today is the foundation of this building. During reconstruction of the station around 1900 when double track was laid, this platform was again extended to a total length of 300 ft. It then became the ‘down’ platform for trains to Bailey Gate, Broadstone, Poole and Bournemouth (West). You can clearly see the different methods of construction where this platform has been extended.

The ‘up’ platform is 300 ft long and was built during reconstruction of the station around 1900. It was used for trains to Blandford, Templecombe, Evercreech Junction (change for the Burnham-on-Sea branch) and Bath (Green Park). This platform opened on 29 April 1901 and was provided with a brick station building containing a booking office, waiting rooms and lavatories. The rear wall of this building still survives as it holds back the field behind the station. The foundations of the various rooms with the three fireplaces can still be seen today.

History

The station was opened on 1 November 1860 by the London and South Western Railway as part of the Dorset Central Railway, and later became part of the Somerset and Dorset Joint Railway. The station became an unstaffed halt in 1934. Becoming part of the Southern Region of British Railways when the railways were nationalised in 1948, the halt was closed in 1956 as part of an economy campaign. Passenger trains continued to pass the site until the S&DJR closed in 1966. The railway was still open until the closure of the goods terminal at Blandford in 1969 and later that year the track was lifted.

Spetisbury Station Project

The station site is currently being looked after by the Spetisbury Station Project Group  The long-term ambition is to reconstruct the buildings as an information centre for the station and Somerset & Dorset railway.

See also
 New Somerset and Dorset Railway

References

Further reading

   
   ISBN(no ISBN)

External links
 Spetisbury Station Project
 SDJR net locations
 Station on navigable O.S. map
 Trainweb.org - Signalling at Spetisbury

Disused railway stations in Dorset
Former Somerset and Dorset Joint Railway stations
Railway stations in Great Britain opened in 1860
Railway stations in Great Britain closed in 1956